Vlasta Fabianová (29 June 1912 – 26 June 1991) was a Czechoslovak film actress. She appeared in more than 30 films between 1940 and 1989.

Selected filmography
 Second Tour (1940)
 Pohádka máje (1940)
 The Wedding Ring (1944)
 Sign of the Anchor (1947)
 Bohemian Rapture (1947)
 Krakatit (1948)
 Nástup (1953)
 The Strakonice Bagpiper (1955)
 The Phantom of Morrisville (1966)
 Those Wonderful Movie Cranks (1978)
 The Salt Prince (1982)

References

External links
 

1912 births
1991 deaths
Actors from Lviv
People from the Kingdom of Galicia and Lodomeria
Czech film actresses
20th-century Czech actresses